Szymon Krawczyk (born 8 August 1998) is a Polish racing cyclist, who currently rides for UCI Continental team . He rode in the men's team pursuit event at the 2018 UCI Track Cycling World Championships.

Major results

2015
 1st  Road race, National Junior Road Championships
 1st  Team pursuit, National Track Championships
 UEC European Junior Track Championships
2nd  Points race
3rd  Team pursuit
 3rd Overall La Coupe du Président de la Ville de Grudziądz
1st Young rider classification
2016
 UEC European Junior Track Championships
1st  Omnium
2nd  Team pursuit
 1st  Points, UCI Junior Track World Championships
 1st  Road race, National Junior Road Championships
 2nd Overall La Coupe du Président de la Ville de Grudziądz
2017
 National Track Championships
2nd Madison
2nd Points race
3rd Individual pursuit
3rd Omnium
 3rd  Team pursuit, UEC European Under-23 Track Championships
2018
 National Track Championships
1st  Madison (with Damian Sławek)
1st  Individual pursuit
2nd Scratch
 3rd  Elimination, UEC European Track Championships
2019
 2nd Scratch, National Track Championships
 6th GP Slovakia
 10th Overall Dookoła Mazowsza
2020
 1st  Time trial, National Under-23 Road Championships
 1st  Scratch, National Track Championships
 1st Stage 2 Giro del Friuli-Venezia Giulia
 3rd Overall Tour of Romania
1st  Young rider classification
 5th Overall Dookoła Mazowsza 
 6th Overall Tour of Szeklerland

References

External links
 

1998 births
Living people
Polish male cyclists
Place of birth missing (living people)
European Games competitors for Poland
Cyclists at the 2019 European Games
People from Jarocin
Polish track cyclists
21st-century Polish people